The Royal Oak was the tree in which Charles II of England hid to escape the Roundheads following the Battle of Worcester in 1651.

Royal Oak or Royal Oaks may also refer to:

Arts and entertainment
 The Royal Oak (film), a 1923 British film directed by Maurice Elvey
 "Royal Oak", a 17th-century English tune, often used for "All Things Bright and Beautiful"

Businesses and organisations

Pubs

 Royal Oak, Bexleyheath, Kent, England
 Royal Oak, Cardiff, Wales
Royal Oak, Eccles, Salford, England
 Royal Oak, Frindsbury, Kent, England
 Royal Oak, Meavy, Devon, England
 Royal Oak Hotel, Balmain, Sydney, Australia
 The Royal Oak, Hail Weston, Cambridgeshire, England
 The Royal Oak (Edinburgh Pub), Scotland
 The Royal Oak, York, England

Other businesses
 Royal Oak Inn, Rouse Hill, a hotel complex in New South Wales, Australia
 Royal Oak Mall, a shopping mall in Auckland, New Zealand
 Royal Oak Mines, a gold mining company
 Royal Oak Music Theatre, Royal Oak, Michigan, U.S.
 Royal Oaks Country Club, Houston, Texas, U.S.
 Royal Oaks Golf Club, Moncton, New Brunswick, Canada
 Royal Oak Foundation, an American charitable body

Schools
 Royal Oak Intermediate, Auckland, New Zealand
 Royal Oak Neighborhood Schools and Royal Oak Middle School, Michigan, U.S.
 Royal Oak High School
 Royal Oak Middle School (on the site of the former Royal Oak High School), Covina, California, U.S.
 Dondero High School, formerly Royal Oak High School, Royal Oak, Michigan, U.S.

Places

United Kingdom
Royal Oak, County Durham
Royal Oak, Lancashire
 Royal Oak, North Yorkshire

United States
 Royal Oaks Park, Monterey County, California
 Royal Oaks, Indiana
 Royal Oak, Maryland
 Royal Oak, Michigan
 Royal Oak Charter Township, Michigan
 Royal Oak, Missouri
 Royal Oaks, Kansas City, a neighborhood of Kansas City, Missouri

Elsewhere
 Royal Oak, Calgary, Alberta, Canada
 Royal Oak, Saanich, British Columbia, Canada
 Royal Oak, County Carlow, Ireland
 Royal Oak, New Zealand

Transportation  
 Royal Oak station (SkyTrain), Burnaby, British Columbia, Canada
 Royal Oak tube station, a London Underground station 
 Royal Oak station (Michigan), Royal Oak, Michigan, U.S.
 Royal Oaks station, a light rail station in Sacramento, California

Warships
 HMS Royal Oak, the name of several warships of the British Royal Navy
 Royal Oak-class ship of the line, a class of six 74-gun third rates in the British Royal Navy

Other uses
 Royal Oak, a watch by Audemars Piguet
 Prix Royal-Oak, a flat horse race in France

See also

Oak Apple Day, or Royal Oak Day